Augsburg Messe station is a railway station in the town of Augsburg, located in Swabia, Bavaria, Germany.

Operations

References

Messe
Railway stations in Germany opened in 2000